Scott Sabourin (born July 30, 1992) is a Canadian professional ice hockey forward currently playing for the Belleville Senators in the American Hockey League (AHL) while under contract to the Ottawa Senators of the National Hockey League (NHL). He has also played in the NHL with the Toronto Maple Leafs.

Playing career
Sabourin played four seasons (2009–2013) of major junior hockey with the Oshawa Generals in the Ontario Hockey League (OHL), scoring 46 goals and 34 assists for 80 points, while earning 330 penalty minutes, in 166 OHL games played.

Undrafted, on April 10, 2013, the Manchester Monarchs signed Sabourin to a two-year AHL contract, and he started his professional career at the tail-end of the 2012–13 AHL season by skating in five regular season and three playoff games with the Monarchs. On October 7, 2013, following an impressive pre-season training camp, Sabourin was signed by the Los Angeles Kings of the National Hockey League (NHL) to a three-year entry-level contract and he was assigned to play the 2013–14 season in the AHL with the Monarchs. During the 2015–16 season, on January 29, 2016, Sabourin was traded by the Kings to the Minnesota Wild in a trade deadline in exchange for center Brett Sutter. 

As a free agent from the Wild in the following off-season, Sabourin signed to continue in the AHL, securing a one-year deal with the San Diego Gulls on September 8, 2016. On July 2, 2017, having impressed with the Gulls, Sabourin was retained by NHL affiliate, the Anaheim Ducks, on a one-year, two-way contract.

As a free agent from the Ducks, Sabourin was later invited to attend the Calgary Flames 2018 training camp. After his release from the Flames, he was later signed to begin the 2018–19 season on a professional try-out contract with AHL affiliate, the Stockton Heat, on October 5, 2018.

After attending the Ottawa Senators training camp on a professional tryout, Sabourin signed a one-year, two-way contract with the Senators on September 27, 2019. Sabourin, who grew up in the Ottawa suburb of Orléans, was coached by Senators coach D. J. Smith during his final year of junior hockey. In opening the 2019–20 season, Sabourin made his NHL debut against the Toronto Maple Leafs on October 2, 2019, scoring his first career NHL goal in a losing effort. Limited through injury, Sabourin played in 35 games with the Senators registering two goals and six points in a fourth-line role.

As a free agent at the conclusion of his contract with the Senators, Sabourin returned to the AHL in securing a one-year deal with the Toronto Marlies on October 16, 2020. Leading into the pandemic-delayed 2020–21 season, Sabourin was later signed to a one-year, two-way contract with the Marlies' NHL affiliate, the Toronto Maple Leafs, on February 6, 2021. He made one appearance with the Maple Leafs, appearing on the fourth line in a 3-2 overtime defeat to the Calgary Flames on April 13, 2021.

As a free agent from the Maple Leafs, Sabourin returned to former club the Ottawa Senators, in agreeing to a one-year, two-way contract on August 17, 2021. He spent the majority of the year with Ottawa's AHL affiliate, the Belleville Senators but managed to get into seven games with Ottawa registering two points. He re-signed with Ottawa to another one-year two-way deal on July 13, 2022.

Career statistics

Awards and honours

References

External links
 

1992 births
Living people
Belleville Senators players
Canadian expatriate ice hockey players in the United States
Canadian ice hockey right wingers
Franco-Ontarian people
Ice hockey people from Ottawa
Iowa Wild players
Manchester Monarchs (AHL) players
Manchester Monarchs (ECHL) players
Ontario Reign (AHL) players
Oshawa Generals players
Ottawa Senators players
San Diego Gulls (AHL) players
Stockton Heat players
Toronto Maple Leafs players
Toronto Marlies players
Undrafted National Hockey League players